HMS Utile was the French 16-gun privateer brig-sloop Utile launched in 1799 that the Royal Navy captured in 1799 and took into service; she foundered in the Mediterranean in 1801.

Utile was launched in 1799 and fitted at Bordeaux.

On 1 April 1799,  captured the brig Utile. Utile was armed with sixteen 8-pounder guns, of which ten were brass. She had a crew of 120 men and was three weeks out of Bordeaux.

Boadicea sent Utile into Portsmouth, where she arrived on 11 April. She sat there until May to October 1801, when she underwent fitting. Commander Edward Jekyll Canes commissioned her in September 1801 for the Mediterranean.

Canes sailed from Portsmouth on the 20 October 1801 for the Mediterranean with details of the preliminaries of the peace treaty. Utile sailed from Gibraltar on 5 November with £27,000 pounds for the payment of the garrison at Minorca. She was never seen again and was presumed to have foundered with all hands.

Citations

References
 
 
 

1799 ships
Ships built in France
Privateer ships of France
Captured ships
Brigs of the Royal Navy
Maritime incidents in 1801
Missing ships
Warships lost with all hands
Shipwrecks in the Mediterranean Sea